The Arena was a liberal literary and political magazine published by Arena Publishing Co. in Boston, Massachusetts. It was founded by Benjamin Orange Flower in 1889 and existed for twenty years. Though it had a circulation of more than 30,000 at one point, it was rarely profitable. The final issue was published in August 1909.

Publication history
The Arena was established by Benjamin Orange Flower in December 1889. The magazine was a monthly with volumes typically consisting of six issues.

The magazine advocated social reform, featuring articles about poverty, slums, sweatshops, child labor, and other social problems. It openly advocated birth control, free silver, agrarian reform, the single tax, and trust-busting. It was the only journal of national import to support William Jennings Bryan in 1896. Later, it advocated penal reform and opposed capital punishment.

It published work by writers such as Upton Sinclair, Stephen Crane and Hamlin Garland. Women wrote a quarter of the contents during its first twenty volumes. A section of Garland's Main-Travelled Roads first appeared in The Arena. The Arena later employed investigative journalists and became known as a muckraker. The magazine published articles on socialism and was supportive of efforts to organize workers into trade unions. It favored literature that supported the poor and powerless.

Footnotes

External links 

 The Arena. Boston: Arena Publishing Co., 1889-1909 at Internet Archive   Vol. 1 | Vol. 2 | Vol. 3 | Vol. 4 | Vol. 5 | Vol. 6 | Vol. 7 | Vol. 8 | Vol. 9 | Vol. 10 | Vol. 11 | Vol. 12 | Vol. 13 | Vol. 14 | Vol. 15 | Vol. 16 | Vol. 17 | Vol. 18 | Vol. 19 | Vol. 20 | Vol. 21 | Vol. 22 | Vol. 23 | Vol. 24 | Vol. 25 | Vol. 26 | Vol. 27 | Vol. 28 | Vol. 29 | Vol. 30 | Vol. 31 | Vol. 32 | Vol. 33 | Vol. 34 | Vol. 35 | Vol. 36 | Vol. 37 | Vol. 38 | Vol. 39 | Vol. 40 | Vol. 41 |
The Arena at HathiTrust

Defunct literary magazines published in the United States
Defunct political magazines published in the United States
Magazines established in 1889
Magazines disestablished in 1909
Magazines published in Boston
Socialist magazines
Monthly magazines published in the United States